Hares Branch is a  long 2nd order tributary to the Worrell Mill Swamp via Worrell Millpond in Hertford County, North Carolina.  This is the only stream of this name in the United States.

Course
Hares Branch rises on the Panther Swamp divide about 0.5 miles south of Murfreesboro, North Carolina, and then flows northeasterly to join Worrell Mill Swamp on the east side of Murfreesboro.

Watershed
Hares Branch drains  of area, receives about 48.3 in/year of precipitation, has a wetness index of 515.21, and is about 23% forested.

See also
List of rivers of North Carolina

References

Rivers of North Carolina
Rivers of Hertford County, North Carolina